Evansville can refer to the following places:

Evansville, Manitoulin District, Ontario
Evansville, Nipissing District, Ontario